Novoalexandrovo is a rural locality (a selo) and the administrative center of Novoalexandrovskoye Rural Settlement, Suzdalsky District, Vladimir Oblast, Russia. The population was 1,219 as of 2010. There are 13 streets.

Geography 
Novoalexandrovo is located 35 km southwest of Suzdal (the district's administrative centre) by road. Olikovo is the nearest rural locality.

References 

Rural localities in Suzdalsky District
Vladimirsky Uyezd